Romeo Bertini (21 April 1893 – 29 August 1973) was an Italian athlete who competed mainly in the marathon.

Biography
He competed for Italy in the 1924 Summer Olympics held in Paris, France in the marathon where he won the silver medal. He also competed in the marathon at the 1928 Summer Olympics, but didn't finish.

Achievements

References

External links
 

1893 births
1973 deaths
Italian male long-distance runners
Italian male marathon runners
Olympic silver medalists for Italy
Athletes (track and field) at the 1924 Summer Olympics
Athletes (track and field) at the 1928 Summer Olympics
Olympic athletes of Italy
Medalists at the 1924 Summer Olympics
Olympic silver medalists in athletics (track and field)